Quenya is a constructed language, one of those devised by J. R. R. Tolkien for the Elves in his Middle-earth fiction.

Tolkien began devising the language around 1910, and restructured its grammar several times until it reached its final state. The vocabulary remained relatively stable throughout the creation process. He successively changed the language's name from Elfin and Qenya to the eventual Quenya. Finnish had been a major source of inspiration, but Tolkien was also fluent in Latin and Old English, and was familiar with Greek, Welsh (the latter being the primary inspiration for Sindarin, Tolkien's other major Elvish language), and other ancient Germanic languages, particularly Gothic, during his development of Quenya.

A notable feature of Tolkien's Elvish languages was his development of a complex internal history of characters to speak those tongues in their own fictional universe. He felt that his languages changed and developed over time, as with the historical languages which he studied professionally—not in a vacuum, but as a result of the migrations and interactions of the peoples who spoke them.

Within Tolkien's legendarium, Quenya is one of the many Elvish languages spoken by the immortal Elves, called Quendi ('speakers') in Quenya. Quenya translates as simply "language" or, in contrast to other tongues that the Elves met later in their long history, "elf-language". After the Elves divided, Quenya originated as the speech of two clans of "High Elves" or Eldar, the Noldor and the Vanyar, who left Middle-earth to live in Eldamar ("Elvenhome"), in Valinor, the land of the immortal and God-like Valar. Of these two groups of Elves, most of the Noldor returned to Middle-earth where they met the Sindarin-speaking Grey-elves. The Noldor eventually adopted Sindarin and used Quenya primarily as a ritual or poetic language, whereas the Vanyar who stayed behind in Eldamar retained the use of Quenya.

In this way, the Quenya language was symbolic of the high status of the Elves, the firstborn of the races of Middle-earth, because of their close connection to Valinor, and its decreasing use also became symbolic of the slowly declining Elven culture in Middle-earth. In the Second Age of Middle-earth's chronology the Men of Númenor learnt the Quenya tongue. In the Third Age, the time of the setting of The Lord of the Rings, Quenya was learnt as a second language by all Elves of Noldorin origin, and it continued to be used in spoken and written form, but their mother-tongue was the Sindarin of the Grey-elves. As the Noldor remained in Middle-earth, their Noldorin dialect of Quenya also gradually diverged from the Vanyarin dialect spoken in Valinor, undergoing both sound changes and grammatical changes.

The Quenya language featured prominently in Tolkien's The Lord of the Rings, as well as in his posthumously published history of Middle-earth The Silmarillion. The longest text in Quenya published by Tolkien during his lifetime is the poem "Namárië"; other published texts are no longer than a few sentences. At his death, Tolkien left behind a number of unpublished writings on Quenya, and later Tolkien scholars have prepared his notes and unpublished manuscripts for publication in the journals Parma Eldalamberon and Vinyar Tengwar, also publishing scholarly and linguistic analyses of the language. Tolkien never created enough vocabulary to make it possible to converse in Quenya, although fans have been writing poetry and prose in Quenya since the 1970s. This has required conjecture and the need to devise new words, in effect developing a kind of neo-Quenya language.

External history 

J. R. R. Tolkien began to construct his first Elven tongue c. 1910–1911 while he was at the King Edward's School, Birmingham. He later called it Qenya (c. 1915), and later changed the spelling to Quenya. He was then already familiar with Latin, Greek, Spanish, and several ancient Germanic languages, such as Gothic, Old Norse, and Old English. He had invented several cryptographic codes, and two or three constructed languages. Tolkien took an interest in the Finnish mythology of the Kalevala, then became acquainted with Finnish, which he found to provide an aesthetically pleasing inspiration for his High-elven language. Many years later, he wrote: "It was like discovering a complete wine-cellar filled with bottles of an amazing wine of a kind and flavour never tasted before. It quite intoxicated me." Regarding the inspiration for Quenya, Tolkien wrote that:

Tolkien never intended Quenya or any of his constructed languages to be used in everyday life as an international auxiliary language, although he was in favour of the idea of Esperanto as an auxiliary language within Europe. With his Quenya, Tolkien pursued a double aesthetic goal: "classical and inflected". This urge, in fact, was the motivation for his creation of a 'mythology'. While the language developed, Tolkien felt that it needed speakers, including their own history and mythology, which he thought would give a language its 'individual flavour'. The Lord of the Rings, according to Tolkien, "was primarily linguistic in inspiration and was begun in order to provide the necessary background of 'history' for Elvish tongues". This process of first inventing a language and then creating a background setting for its fictional speakers has been described as unique. Dimitra Fimi, a Tolkien scholar, argues that Tolkien's invention of Qenya started as a quest for the ideal language, to match the moral and aesthetic objectives that were part of his project of creating "a mythology for England". Fimi argues that Tolkien deliberately used sound symbolism to unify sound and meaning and make the language appear as an ideal language, fit to be spoken in the utopian realm of the Elves and fairies of Valinor. Tolkien considered Quenya to be "the one language which has been designed to give play to my own most normal phonetic taste".

From the onset, Tolkien used comparative philology and the tree model as his major tools in his constructed languages. He usually started with the phonological system of the proto-language and then proceeded by inventing for each daughter language the necessary sequence of sound changes. "I find the construction and the interrelation of the languages an aesthetic pleasure in itself, quite apart from The Lord of the Rings, of which it was/is in fact independent."

Development

In his lifetime, Tolkien experimented ceaselessly with his constructed languages, and they were subjected to many revisions. Quenya had many grammars with substantial differences between the different stages of its development. During the first conceptual stage of early Quenya c. 1910 to c. 1920, the language was called Elfin in English and Eldarissa in Qenya proper. While its development was a continuous process, Quenya underwent a number of major revisions in its grammar, mostly in conjugation and the pronominal system. The vocabulary, however, was not subject to sudden or extreme change. Tolkien sometimes changed the meaning of a word, but he almost never discarded it once invented, and he kept on refining its meaning, and countlessly forged new synonyms. Moreover, Elvish etymology was in constant flux. Tolkien delighted in inventing new etymons for his Quenya vocabulary. But after the publication of The Lord of the Rings (finished c. 1949–1950, published in 1954–1955), the grammar rules of Quenya went through very few changes and this version was then defined as late Quenya (c. 1950–1973).

The spelling Qenya is sometimes used to distinguish early Quenya from later versions. Qenya differs from late Quenya by having different internal history, vocabulary, and grammar rules as described in the "Qenyaqetsa". Examples include a different accusative or the abolition of final consonant clusters in later Quenya. Fimi suggests that Qenya as it appears in the "Qenyaqetsa" was supposed to be a mystic language, as the Lexicon contains a number of words with clear Christian religious connotations, such as anatarwesta "crucifixion" and evandilyon "gospel" – these words were not part of late Quenya.

In the early 1930s, Tolkien decided that the proto-language of the Elves was Valarin, the tongue of the gods or Valar as he called them: "The language of the Elves derived in the beginning from the Valar, but they changed it even in the learning, and moreover modified and enriched it constantly at all times by their own invention." In the Comparative Tables the mechanisms of sound change were described by Tolkien for the following daughter languages: Qenya, Lindarin (a dialect of Qenya), Telerin, Old Noldorin (or Fëanorian), Noldorin (or Gondolinian), Ilkorin (especially of Doriath), Danian of Ossiriand, East Danian, Taliska, West Lemberin, North Lemberin, and East Lemberin. For this proto-language of the Elves, Tolkien appears to have borrowed the five-part plosive system of Proto-Indo-European, the ancestor of Sanskrit, Greek, Latin, and others; namely, one labial, one coronal, and three velar plosives (palatal, plain, and labial). The first table below provides some of the "Primary Initial Combinations" from the Comparative Tables.

Another characteristic of Quenya reminiscent of ancient natural languages like Old Greek, Old English or Sanskrit is the dual grammatical number which is used in addition to singular and plural. It has been suggested that Tolkien used the dual to give Quenya an "archaic feel" in its role as an ancient language of the Elves.

About ten years later, Tolkien changed his mind about the origin of the Elvish proto-language. Instead of learning from the Valar, the Elves had created an original language Quenderin which had become the proto-language of the Elven language family. For this new language, Tolkien kept the many roots he had invented for Valarin in the 1930s, which then became "Quenderin roots". The Eldarin family of languages comprises Quenya, Telerin, Sindarin and Nandorin. The evolution in Quenya and Telerin of the nasalised initial groups of Quenderin is described thus in Tolkien's Outline of Phonology:

In contrast to early Qenya, the grammar of Quenya was influenced by Finnish, an agglutinative language, but much more by Latin, a synthetic and fusional language, and also Greek, from which he probably took the idea of the diglossia of Quenya with its highly codified variety: the Parmaquesta, used only in certain situations such as literature. The phonology of Quenya was also inspired by certain aspects of Finnish, but this is not easily recognised.

Tolkien almost never borrowed words directly from real languages into Quenya. The major exception is the name Earendel/Eärendil, which he found in an Old English poem by Cynewulf. Yet the Finnish influence extended sometimes also to the vocabulary. A few Quenya words, such as tul- "come" and anta- "give", clearly have a Finnish origin. Other forms that appear to have been borrowed are actually coincidental, such as Finnish kirja "book", and Quenya cirya "ship". Tolkien invented the Valarin/Quenderin root kir- from which sprang his Quenya word cirya. The Latin aure "dawn", and Quenya aure "moment of special meaning, special day, festival day" are unrelated. Instead, Quenya aurë comes from the Valarin/Quenderin root ur-. Germanic influence can more be seen in grammar (the -r nominative plural ending is reminiscent of the Scandinavian languages) or phonology, than in words: Arda, the Quenya name for "region", just happened to resemble Germanic Erde "earth", while it actually comes from the Valarin/Quenderin root gar-. According to Tom DuBois and Scott Mellor, the name of Quenya itself may have been influenced by the name Kven, a language closely related to Finnish, but Tolkien never mentioned this.

Some linguists have argued that Quenya can be understood as an example of a particular kind of artificial language that helps to create a fictional world. Other such languages would include Robert Jordan's Old Tongue and the Klingon language of the Star Trek series invented by Marc Okrand. It was observed that they form "a sociolinguistic context within which group and individual identities can be created."

Publication of linguistic papers 

Two journals, Vinyar Tengwar from issue No. 39 (July 1998), and Parma Eldalamberon from issue No. 11 (1995), have been exclusively devoted to the editing and publishing of Tolkien's mass of unpublished linguistic papers. Important grammatical texts, alluded to in the History of Middle-earth series and described as almost unreadable or quite incomprehensible, have been published in these two journals. The "Early Qenya Grammar", written by Tolkien c. 1925, was edited and published in Parma Eldalamberon No. 14.

Scholarship 

In 1992, according to the linguist Helge Fauskanger,  the Tolkien scholar Anthony Appleyard made "the first comprehensive attempt ...  to systematize Quenya grammar in light of the new information published in The History of Middle-earth, particularly The Etymologies, in his article 'Quenya Grammar Reexamined'."  Hostetter commented that Appleyard's work was by 2007 useful mainly for summarising the attitudes to Tolkien's languages at that time. He characterised it as:

 seeking to label and describe a unique function for each "grammatical inflection", such as the so-called "respective case"
 seeking to "fill in gaps" that a linguist of English or Latin might expect
 seeking to avoid "(supposed) 'clashes' and 'ambiguities'"
 being willing "to reject or even ascribe to authorial error" grammatical forms that did not seem to fit in
 seeking to complete or extend the languages by creating new forms
 being willing to declare Tolkien's early words or forms "obsolete" if later forms seemed to have the same meanings
 being willing to conflate forms from different Tolkien stages when these seemed to be "useful"

In 2008, the computational linguist Paul Strack created the Elvish Data Model (abbreviated to "Eldamo") to provide a lexicon – both a dictionary and an analysis of language development – of all Tolkien's languages (despite the name, not limited to Elvish). Eldamo groups Tolkien's creative work into three real-world periods: up to 1930 ("Early"); from then to 1950 ("Middle"); and from then to 1973 ("Late"). Forms of Quenya occur in each of these periods, as follows:

The linguist Alexander Stainton published an analysis of Quenya's prosodic structure in 2022.

Use of Quenya 

Attempts by fans to write in Quenya began in the 1970s, when the total corpus of published Elvish comprised only a few hundred words. Since then, the use of Elvish has flourished in poems and texts, phrases and names, and even tattoos. But Tolkien himself never made his languages complete enough for conversation. As a result, newly invented Elvish texts require conjecture and sometimes the coinage of new words. The use of Quenya has expanded over the years as new words have been created, forming a Neo-Quenya language that is based on Tolkien's original Quenya but incorporates many new elements.

Internal history

The Elvish languages are a family of several related languages and dialects. The following is a brief overview of the fictional internal history of late Quenya as conceived by Tolkien. Tolkien imagined an Elven society with a vernacular language for every-day use, Tarquesta, and a more educated language for use in ceremonies and lore, Parmaquesta.

The Tolkien scholar Verlyn Flieger observed that the "degree of proximity" to the light of the Valar affected the development of both languages in terms of phonology, morphology and semantics. The division between Light Elves and Dark Elves that took place during the Sundering of the Elves is reflected in their respective languages.

Primitive Quendian 

The Elves at first shared a common language, Primitive Quendian, called Quenderin in Quenya.  Among the Eldar, i.e. those Elves who undertook the Great March to Valinor and Eldamar, Primitive Quendian developed into Common Eldarin.  Some of the Eldar remained in Beleriand and became the Grey Elves; their language developed into Sindarin.  Most of the other Eldar continued to Eldamar ('Elvenhome') in Aman and founded the great city of Tirion, where they developed Quenya.

Quenya's older form, first recorded in the sarati of Rúmil, is called Old or Ancient Quenya (Yára-Quenya in Quenya).  In Eldamar, the Noldor and Vanyar spoke two slightly different though mutually intelligible dialects of Tarquesta: Noldorin Quenya and Vanyarin Quenya. Later Noldorin Quenya became Exilic Quenya, when most of the Noldor Elves followed their leader Fëanor into exile from Eldamar and back to Middle-earth, where the immortal Elves first awoke.

Use by Elves, Valar, and Men 

Quenya was used by the godlike Valar. The Elves derived some loanwords from the Valar's language, which was called Valarin in Quenya, although these were more numerous in the Vanyarin dialect than in Noldorin. This was probably because of the enduringly close relationship the Vanyarin Elves had with the Valar. The Quenya as used by the Vanyar also incorporated several words from Valarin that were not found in the Noldorin dialect, such as tulka ("yellow", from Valarin tulukha(n)), ulban ("blue", presumably from the same root as Valarin ul(l)u meaning "water"), and nasar ("red", original Valarin not given).

According to "Quendi and Eldar: Essekenta Eldarinwa", Quendya was the usual Vanyarin name given to the Quenya language, since in Vanyarin, the consonant groups ndy and ny remained quite distinct. In Noldorin, ndy eventually became ny. Tolkien explained that "the word Quenya itself has been cited as an exempla (e.g. by Ælfwine), but this is a mistake due to supposition that kwenya was properly kwendya and directly derived from the name Quendi 'Elves'. This appears not to be the case. The word is Quenya in Vanyarin, and always so in Parmaquesta."

The Elves of the Third Clan, or Teleri, who reached Eldamar later than the Noldor and the Vanyar, spoke a different but closely related tongue, usually called Telerin. It was seen by some Elves to be just another dialect of Quenya. This was not the case with the Teleri for whom their tongue was distinct from Quenya. After the Vanyar left the city of Túna, Telerin and Noldorin Quenya grew closer.

The rebellious Noldor, who followed their leader Fëanor to Middle-earth, spoke only Quenya. But Elu Thingol, King of the Sindar of Beleriand, forbade the use of Quenya in his realm when he learned of the slaying of Telerin Elves by the Noldor. By doing so, he both restricted the possibility of the Sindar to enhance and brighten their language with influences from Quenya and accelerated the "dimininution and spiritual impoverishment" of the Noldorin culture. The Noldor at this time had fully mastered Sindarin, while the Sindar were slow to learn Quenya. Quenya in Middle-earth became known as Exilic Quenya when the Noldor eventually adopted the Sindarin language as their native speech after Thingol's ruling. It differed from Amanian Quenya mostly in vocabulary, having some loanwords from Sindarin. It differed also in pronunciation, representing the recognition of sound-changes which had begun among the Noldor before the exile and had caused Noldorin Quenya to diverge from Vanyarin Quenya. The change of z (< old intervocalic s) to r was the latest in Noldorin, belonging to early Exilic Quenya. The grammatical changes were only small though since the features of their "old language" were carefully taught.

From the Second Age on, Quenya was used ceremonially by the Men of Númenor and their descendants in Gondor and Arnor for the official names of kings and queens; this practice was resumed by Aragorn when he took the crown as Elessar Telcontar. Quenya in the Third Age had almost the same status as the Latin language had in medieval Europe, and was called Elven-latin by Tolkien.

Phonology

Tolkien described the pronunciation of the Elvish languages by Elves, Men and Hobbits has been described in a variety of sources. The documentation about late Quenya phonology is contained in the Appendix E of the Lord of the Rings and the "Outline of Phonology", one of Tolkien's texts, published in Parma Eldalamberon No. 19.

Tolkien based Quenya pronunciation more on Latin than on Finnish. Thus, Quenya lacks the vowel harmony and consonant gradation present in Finnish, and accent is not always on the first syllable of a word. Typical Finnish elements like the front vowels ö, ä and y are lacking in Quenya, but phonological similarities include the absence of aspirated unvoiced stops or the development of the syllables ti > si in both languages. The combination of a Latin basis with Finnish phonological rules resulted in a product that resembles Italian in many respects, which was Tolkien's favourite modern Romance language.

The tables below list the consonants (Q. ólamar) and vowels of late colloquial Noldorin Quenya, i.e. Quenya as spoken among the Exiled Noldor in Middle-earth. They are written using the International Phonetic Alphabet, unless otherwise noted.

Consonants 

The Quenya consonant system has 6 major places of articulation: labial (involving the lips), dental (involving the tongue and the back of the teeth), alveolar (involving the tongue and the alveolar ridge of the jaw), palatal (involving the tongue and the middle part of the roof of the mouth), velar (involving the back of the tongue and the back part of the roof of the mouth), and glottal (involving the vocal folds). Notably, voiced plosives only occur after nasals and liquids, i.e. there is no simple  but only the clusters , and these occur only between vowels. (This may not be true in Vanyarin Quenya, given the word Aldudénië, the name of a lament for the death of the Two Trees of Valinor composed by Elemmírë of the Vanyar.) Prenasalised consonants are prominent in Quenya, and include their own tengwar. The following table presents the inventory of classic Noldorin consonants.

{| class="wikitable" style="text-align:center"
|+ 2. Quenya consonants
! 
! Labial
! Alveolar
! Palatal
! Velar
! Glottal
|-
!Nasal
| 
| 
|
| 
|
|-
! Plosive
|  
|  
|
|  
|
|-
! Fricative
|  
| 
|
| 
| 
|-
!Trill
|
| 
|
|
|
|-
! Semivowel
| 
|
| 
|
|
|-
! Lateral
|
| 
|
|
|
|}

In some instances  was used for the combination  as in Helcaraxë.

Morphophonemics and allophony

Some consonants are realised differently when they occur in clusters with certain other consonants. This particularly concerns clusters that involve the approximants  or the glottal fricative .

Palatal clusters 

In Vanyarin Quenya,  is pronounced .

According to Tolkien, the cluster   is pronounced as "a 'front explosive' [c], as e.g. Hungarian ty, but it is followed by an appreciable partly unvoiced y-offglide".

Tolkien stated that the cluster  is pronounced as in English "new" . Hungarian lopj  'steal'.

Labial clusters 

It has more tense with closer lip-aperture and more friction than the voiceless wh of English".

Glottal clusters 

These, like their Sindarin equivalents, derived from Primitive Elvish sl- and sr-. Voiceless hl and hr have a complex history which Tolkien describes thus: "Among the Noldor hr, hl became voiced to r, l before the Exile, and the use of r, l in these cases was normal in Tarquesta, as spoken, tho' the spelling was usually maintained. Since later the Exiles were familiar with voiceless hr, hl in their Sindarin speech many of them restored this sound in Tarquesta, according to the traditional spelling. The learned had, of course, at all times retained hr, hl in reading or reciting Parmaquesta."

Simplification of clusters 

In the late Ancient Quenya period, when vowels were lost in long compound words, the clusters thus created, or the consonants that became final, were as a rule changed or reduced:
-m > -n;
all stops > -t;
-d > -r;
-th > -t;
-nd > -n;
-mb, -ng > -n;
-ñ > -n;
any combination with s (as -ts, -st, -ss) > -s;
any combination with -ht > -t.

Vowels 

Quenya has five vowels (Quenya ómar), and a distinction of length. The short vowels are /a, e, i, o, u/ and the long ones are written with an acute accent as /á, é, í, ó, ú/. The precise quality of the vowels is not known, but their pronunciation is likely closer to the "pure" vowels of Italian and Spanish than to the diphthongised English ones. According to Pesch, for the vowels /a, i, u/ the short and long forms have the same vowel quality, similar to the vowels of Finnish or Polish. This interpretation is based on a statement by Tolkien, saying that é and ó, when correctly pronounced by Elves, were just a little "tenser and 'closer'" than their short counterparts: "neither very tense and close, nor very slack and open". This interpretation results in a vowel system with 7 different vowel qualities and a length distinction in the high and low vowels only; this system is depicted in table 3.

Late Noldorin Quenya has 6 diphthongs (Quenya ohloni): /iu, eu, ai, au, oi, ui/. All of these are falling, except for/iu/ which is rising. In Old Quenya, all diphthongs were falling. Tolkien wrote: "It is probable that before the Exile Vanyarin and Noldorin [Quenya] in common shifted iu, ui to rising diphthongs, (...) but only  is reported as a rising diphthong  similar to the beginning of English yule . On the other hand, ui remained in Exilic Quenya a falling diphthong as reported".

Syllables and stress 

In Quenya, the stressing of a syllable is predictable and non-phonemic (i.e. the meaning of a word never changes depending on the stress), but it is partly determined by syllable weight. Words of two syllables are stressed on the first syllable. In words of three or more syllables, the stress is on the penultimate syllable if this is heavy, otherwise on the antepenultimate syllable, i.e. the third-to-last syllable. This stress rule is the same as the stress-pattern found in Latin. In Quenya, heavy syllables are syllables that contain either a long vowel, a diphthong, or a final consonant (thus an intervocalic consonant cluster: ll, ld, mm, ss, ny, ry, etc.). Medially hy and hw close a syllable in Parmaquesta, but not colloquially in Tarquesta. Quenya has also a secondary accent. The placement of stress and the distinction between heavy and light syllables is important in Quenya verse.

Phonotactics 

Tolkien also devised phonotactical rules for late Quenya, governing the way in which the sounds could be combined to form words:

Only the following consonants have phonemically geminated forms, i.e. elongated consonants:
pp, tt, cc, mm, nn, ss, ll, rr. (However, Quenya for "death" is effírië, featuring a geminated f.)
These occur only medially. The geminated occlusives pp, tt, cc are aspirated. 
 Tolkien wrote that in Common Eldarin as final consonants only the "dentals t, s, d, th, n, r, l (all frequent except th) and the labial nasal m (frequent). In addition the combination -nt (though usually a coalescence of more than one inflexional element) seems also to have been permitted; possibly also st. No other consonant groups were tolerated. y, w are not included, since they naturally took the syllabic forms i, u as suffixed elements." These evolved from Common Eldarin to Quenya Tolkien explains on the same page thus: m > n ; t, n, r and s remained without change ; final C.E. th became Quenya t and final d > r, and so: "the list of 'permissible finals':
n, r, l, s, t, nt
remained constant in Quenya speech-feeling".
 Quenya tolerates only the following initial consonants:
p, t, c, f, s, h, hy, hw, m, n, ñ, v, l, hl, r, hr, y, w. 
 Quenya tolerates only the following initial groups:
x, ps, ty, ny, ly, qu, ñw (became nw in Noldorin Quenya)
 Quenya tolerates only the following medial biconsonantal groups (those especially common are bolded):
ht, lc, ld, lf, lm, lp, lqu, lt, lv, lw, ly, mb, mn, mp, my, nc, nd, ng, nt, nw (ñw initial only), ny, ps, pt, qu, rc, rd, rm, rn, rp, rt, rs, rv, rw, ry, sc, st, sw, ts, tw, ty, x.
 Quenya does not tolerate triconsonantal (or longer) combinations, except c, h, g followed by w, or h, t, d followed by y. So, Quenya permits the following 12 triconsonantal groups only:
nqu, lqu, rqu, squ, ngw, rhw, nty, lty, hty, rty, sty, lhy.
Differences in triconsonant pronunciation:
hty  in Noldorin Quenya,  in Vanyarin Quenya,
sty  in Noldorin Quenya,  in Vanyarin Quenya (cf. ść vs. szcz in Polish),
In all other cases y, and w became syllabic i, u after the consonant groups.
 Quenya does not tolerate the combination of two different occlusives. "Where these anciently occurred, as in pt, ct, one of the two, or both, became opened and spirantal."
 As in Sindarin, the combination ft is avoided.

Grammar 

The grammar of Quenya is agglutinative and mostly suffixing, i.e. different word particles are joined by appending them. It has basic word classes of verbs, nouns and pronouns/determiners, adjectives and prepositions. Nouns are inflected for case and number. Verbs are inflected for tense and aspect, and for agreement with subject and object. In early Quenya, adjectives agree with the noun they modify in case and number, but not in later Quenya, where this agreement disappears. The basic word order is subject–verb–object. Unless otherwise noted, samples in this section refer to Late Quenya as conceived by Tolkien after 1951.

Nouns

Quenya nouns can have up to four numbers: singular, general plural ("plural 1"), particular/partitive plural ("plural 2"), and dual. In late Quenya Tarquesta, the plural is formed by a suffix to the subjective form of the noun: for plural 1 the suffix is -i or -r; for plural 2 the suffix is -li. Quenya nouns are declined for case. Parmaquesta Quenya has ten cases. These include the four primary cases: nominative, accusative, genitive, and instrumental; three adverbial cases: allative (of which the dative is a shortened form), locative (also with a shortened form), and ablative; and a possessive or adjectival case. The accusative was however only used for Parmaquesta and had been replaced by nominative in late colloquial Quenya.

Adjectives

In late Quenya, the singular endings are -a, -ë, -ëa, and a rare form -in that may be seen as a shortened form of -ina. The corresponding plural forms are -ë,-i, ië, and possibly -inë. The latter version is however not attested. Quenya adjectives may be freely used as nouns, in which case they are also inflected like a noun: e.g. vinya, "new", may be used as vinyar, "news".

Prepositions and adverbs 

In Quenya, there are many similarities in form between prepositions and adverbs since the grammatical case already determines the relation of verb and object. Thus:

an i falmali = i falmalinna(r) "upon the many waves"

The preposition an is related to the -nna case ending.

Pronouns 

As with all parts of Quenya grammar, the pronominal system was subject to many revisions throughout Tolkien's life, and the available corpus was not systematic until a list of endings was published in Vinyar Tengwar No. 49 in 2007. In late Quenya, pronouns have both separate or independent forms, and suffix forms.

The separate pronouns have both a short and long form that are used for emphatic and normal pronouns respectively. Such emphatic disjunctive pronouns, were already present in early Quenya but differed from the later versions (e.g. plural: ,).

If a pronoun is the subject of a sentence, it becomes tied to the verb either as separate word directly before the verb, or as a suffix after the inflected verb.
, literally "have found-I-it", "I have found it" ( Aragorn's outcry when he finds the sapling of the White Tree.)
, "You have found it/him/her".
, "You have found them".

It is debated whether certain attested special male and female pronouns that were exclusively used for the description of persons are still applicable to late Quenya as found in The Lord of the Rings.

Possessive determiners 

The possessive determiners (analogous to English my, his, etc.) are used to indicate the possessor of the noun they determine. They mark the person and number of the possessor, and are inflected to agree with the noun they are attached in number and case. While the English language distinguishes between masculine and feminine singular possessors (his vs. her), late Quenya generally does not.

"Since by Quenya idiom in describing the parts of body of several persons the number proper to each individual is used, the plural of parts existing in pairs (as hands, eyes, ears, feet) is seldom required. Thus  "their hand" would be used, (they raised) their hands (one each), (they raised) their hands (each both), and  could not occur".

 "They raised their hands."
 "They raised their hands."
 "Varda has uplifted her (two) hands."

Demonstrative

The demonstrative makes a three-way distinction between entities the speaker is referring to:

, "this";
, "that (over there)";
, "that (over there, away from both of us)".

Verbs

According to Tolkien, "the inflections of [Qenya] verbs are always pretty regular", and Quenya verbs are either in a personal form or an impersonal form. Usually in linguistics, an impersonal verb is a verb that cannot take a true subject, because it does not represent an action, occurrence, or state-of-being of any specific person, place, or thing. This is not how Tolkien intended the use of "impersonal." As explained by Tolkien, verbs in Quenya are negated by using a "negative verb"  in front of the proper verb in the impersonal tense form.

Tolkien noted that "when the emphatic pronoun is used separately the verb has no inflexion (save for number)."

 "Finwë is making (right now)."
 "The Elves are making."
 "I am making."
 "We are making."
 "He/She is (really) making."
 "We are (really) making."

Late Quenya verbs have also a dual agreement morpheme :
 "May two stars shine."

In the imperative mood, plurality and duality are not expressed. There is no agreement. The verb stays singular.

The copula in late Quenya is the verb . Tolkien stated that it was used only in joining adjectives, nouns, and pronouns in statements (or wishes) asserting (or desiring) a thing to have certain quality, or to be same as another, and also that the copula was not used when the meaning was clear. Otherwise, the copula is left out, which may provide for ambiguous tenses when there is no further context:
, can be translated in English either as "Elves are ambidexters", or "Elves were ambidexters".
. "A is good", or "A was good".

Syntax 

Quenya allows for a flexible word order because it is an inflectional language like Latin. Nevertheless, it has word order rules. The usual syntax structure is subject-verb-object. The adjective can be placed before or after the noun that it modifies.

Vocabulary 

Because many of Tolkien's writings on the Elvish languages remain unpublished it is difficult to know how large a vocabulary he devised. By 2008, about 25,000 Elvish words had been published.

Proper nouns 

Quenya's proper nouns are names of people and things in Middle-earth.

  "Rest";  "Bride";  "He who Arises in Might";  "Youth";  "Sublime";  "Steadfast one."
  "Fell Fire";  "Most Bright Lady";  "Cunning Man";  "Spirit of Fire"; {{Olórin}} "(?)Dreamer"; {{Sauron}} "The Abhorred."
  "Music of the Ainur";  "Home of the Eldar";  "Jaws of Ice";  "Father of All";  "Ever Snow-white Peak";  "Rock of Song";  "Master of Doom";  "land of the Vali", sc. Valar;  "Foam-flower";  "Giver of fruits."
  "Land under the Waves";  "Lofty Tower of the Elvish-people";  "Tale of the Silmarils."

Some prepositions and adverbs 

 : [place] beyond; [time] after.
 : up(wards).
 : towards, upon.
 : forth, out of [with the complement noun in ablative case]
 : [static] far beyond.
 : far, far off, far away.
 : [addition] beyond ; over and above, in addition to.
 : [not touching] beneath, under.
 : 1. under. 2. upon. 3. after (of place), behind.
 : under, beneath.
 : 1. in front of, ahead, before [in all relation but time]. 2, after [of time only].

Greetings 

The word used as a form of polite address to an Elf (male or female) is Tar. Among the Númenoreans it became "King/Queen" and used as a form of address for a superior, especially a King or a Queen; cf. Tarinya, used by Prince Aldarion to address his father, King Tar-Meneldur.

 Namárië  is a reduced form of Quenya , literally "be well". It is a formula used in Tarquesta for greetings and also for farewell.
 The most usual formula used by the Noldor for greeting each other is  "(Stay) in happiness!"
In The Lord of the Rings, the hobbit Frodo Baggins used another address of welcome: , corrected by Tolkien in the Second Edition to  This was a traditional formula in an elevated style, used between people going on crossing paths: "A star shines upon the hour of the meeting of our ways".
 The most usual formula used by the Noldor in farewells is  "Go happily!", or  "To happiness!".

Numerals 

According to Christopher Tolkien, "the Eldar used two systems of numerals one of sixes (or twelves), and one of fives. (or tens)." That is a duodecimal counting (base 12), and a decimal system. The Quenya word made by J. R. R. Tolkien for the 'decimal system of counting' is maquanotië - "hand counting".

The known numbers for 1–20 are presented below; those from early Quenya ("Early Qenya Grammar") are in bold.

Other attested number words include esta and inga for 'first'. Tolkien was dissatisfied with esta, the definition is marked with a query in the "Etymologies". Maqua means specifically a group of five objects, like the English word "pentad"; similarly maquat "pair of fives" refers to a group of ten objects. The word yunquenta for thirteen literally means "12 and one more".

"Qenya" numerals above twenty show that the smaller units come first,  "21" being "one-twenty", and also reflects in how it's written in Tengwar.

Writing systems

Most of the time, Tolkien wrote his invented languages using the Latin script, but he devised his own writing systems to match the internal histories of his languages.

Elvish writing systems

Tolkien imagined many writing systems for his Elves. The best-known is the "Tengwar of Fëanor" but the first one he created c. 1919 was the "Tengwar of Rumil", also called the sarati. He decided that, prior to their Exile, the Noldorin Elves first used the sarati of Rúmil to record Ancient Quenya. In Middle-earth, Quenya appears to have been rarely written using the "Elvish runes" or cirth, named certar in Quenya.

Latin script

Tolkien's spelling in Latin script of Quenya was largely phonemic, with each letter corresponding to a specific phoneme in the language. However, the vowels varied in pronunciation depending upon their length. Specific rules for consonants were provided in Appendix E of The Lord of the Rings, e.g. the letter c is always pronounced k, qu stands for kw, Orqui is Orkwi. Tolkien's standard orthography for Quenya uses all the letters of the Latin script except j, k, and z, together with the acute and diaeresis marks on vowels; the letters ñ, þ and z only appear in early Quenya. Occasionally, Tolkien wrote Quenya with a "Finnish-style" orthography (rather than the standard Latin-Romance version), in which c is replaced by k, y with j, and long vowels written double. The acute accent marks long vowels, while the diaeresis indicates that a vowel is not part of a diphthong, for example in ëa or ëo, while final e is marked with a diaeresis to remind English-speakers that it is not silent.

Corpus 

The poem "" is the longest piece of Quenya found in The Lord of the Rings, yet the first sentence in Quenya is uttered by a Hobbit; namely Frodo's greeting to the Elves: . Other examples include Elendil's words spoken upon reaching Middle-earth, and repeated by Aragorn at his coronation:  "Out of the Great Sea to Middle-earth I am come. In this place I will abide, and my heirs, unto the ending of the world!" Treebeard's greeting to Celeborn and Galadriel is also spoken in Quenya:  "O beautiful ones, parents of beautiful children". Another fragment is Sam's cry when he uses Galadriel's phial against Shelob:  "Hail Eärendil, brightest of stars!" And in The Silmarillion, the phrase  "The day has come! Behold, people of the Eldar and Fathers of Men, the day has come!", is cried by Fingon before the Battle of Unnumbered Tears.

A faulty fragment of the poem "Narqelion", written in early Quenya or Elfin between November 1915 and March 1916, was published by Humphrey Carpenter in his Biography. A facsimile of the entire poem was published only in 1999.

See also 

 Elvish languages (Middle-earth)
 Languages constructed by J. R. R. Tolkien
 Sarati
 Sindarin

References

Primary 

This list identifies each item's location in Tolkien's writings. The entries in the journals Parma Eldalamberon and Vinyar Tengwar contain Tolkien's previously-unpublished accounts of the language, annotated by scholars, so these are not purely primary sources.

Secondary

Sources

Further reading 

 Appleyard, Anthony (1992). "Quenya Grammar Re-Examined". Quettar 43, pp. 3–21.
 Derzhanski, Ivan A. (1997). "E man i yulma oi enquanta men?" Vinyar Tengwar 38, pp. 14–18.
 Foster, Robert and Glen GoodKnight (1971). "Sindarin and Quenya Phonology". Mythcon I: Proceedings, 54–56. Los Angeles: Mythopoeic Society.
 Gilson, Christopher and Carl F. Hostetter (1994). "The entu, ensi, enta Declension: A Preliminary Analysis". Vinyar Tengwar 36, pp. 7–29.
 Gilson, Christopher and Patrick Wynne (1991). "The Elves at Koivienéni: A New Quenya Sentence". Mythlore 17(3), pp. 23–30.
 Hostetter, Carl F. (1992). ""Si man i-yulmar n(g)win enquatuva": A Newly-Discovered Tengwar Inscription". Vinyar Tengwar 21, pp. 6–10.
 
 Kloczko, Edward (1995). Dictionnaire des langues elfiques, volume 1 (Quenya-Français-Anglais/Quenya-French-English). Toulon: Tamise.
 
 Welden, Bill (2001). "Negation in Quenya". Vinyar Tengwar 42, pp. 32–34.
 Wynne, Patrick H. and Christopher Gilson (1993). "Trees of Silver and of Gold: A Guide to the Koiveinéni Manuscript". Vinyar Tengwar 27, pp. 7–42.

External links 

 The Elvish Linguistic Fellowship
 Parma Eldalamberon
 Vinyar Tengwar
 Ardalambion – Helge Fauskanger's site on Tolkien languages, with Quenya course and materials
 Thorsten Renk's page on Elvish Languages
 Thorsten Renk's Quetin i lambë eldaiva - a Quenya Course (gz archive)
 "The s-case" – Ales Bican examines the evidence for the shortened form of the locative (-s).
 Quenya–English dictionary

Agglutinative languages
Middle-earth languages
Subject–verb–object languages
Middle-earth Elves
Constructed languages introduced in the 1910s
1910 introductions
Constructed languages